The  is a 938 CE Japanese dictionary of Chinese characters. The Heian period scholar Minamoto no Shitagō (源順, 911–983 CE) began compilation in 934, at the request of Emperor Daigo's daughter. This Wamyō ruijushō title is abbreviated as Wamyōshō, and has graphic variants of 和名類聚抄 with wa 和 "harmony; Japan" for wa 倭 "dwarf; Japan" and 倭名類聚鈔 with shō 鈔 "copy; summarize" for shō 抄 "copy; annotate".

The Wamyō ruijushō is the oldest extant Japanese dictionary organized into semantic headings, analogous to a Western language thesaurus. This ancient lexicographical collation system was developed in Chinese dictionaries like the Erya, Xiao Erya, and Shiming. The Wamyōshō categorizes kanji vocabulary, primarily nouns, into main headings (bu 部) divided into subheadings (rui 類). For instance, the tenchi (天地 "heaven and earth") heading includes eight semantic divisions like seishuku (星宿 "stars and constellations"), un'u (雲雨 "clouds and rain"), and fūsetsu (風雪 "wind and snow").

Each dictionary entry gives the Chinese character, sources cited, Chinese pronunciations (with either a homonym or fanqie spelling), definitions, and corresponding Japanese readings (in the ancient Man'yōgana system using kanji to represent Japanese pronunciation). It cites over 290 sources, both Chinese (for example, the Shuowen Jiezi) and Japanese (the Man'yōshū).

The Wamyō ruijushō, survives in both a 10-volume edition (十巻本) and a 20-volume edition (二十巻本). The larger one was published in 1617 with a commentary by Nawa Dōen (那波道円, 1595–1648) and was used in the Edo period until the 1883 publication of the 10-volume edition annotated by Kariya Ekisai (狩谷棭齋, 1775–1835), also known as the Senchū Wamyō ruijushō (箋注倭名類聚抄 "Annotated commentary to the Wamyō ruijushō"). The 10-volume edition has 24 main headings divided into a total of 128 subheadings, while the 20-volume version has 32 and 249, respectively. The table below illustrates how words are semantically categorized in the 10-volume edition.

The broadly inclusive Wamyō ruijushō dictionary was an antecedent for Japanese encyclopedias. In the present day, it provides linguists and historians with an invaluable record of the Japanese language over a thousand years ago, more specifically the linguistics of the 10th century and Heian Period.

References

Further reading

External links
倭名類聚鈔 , Waseda University Library online Wamyō ruijushō (in Japanese)
Manuscript scans at Waseda University Library: 1617, 1667, 1667, 1688, 17th century, 17th century

1617 books
1883 books
10th-century Japanese books
Japanese dictionaries
Japanese encyclopedias
Late Old Japanese texts
938
10th century in Japan
Heian-period books